Álvaro Arnedo González (born 9 June 1996) is a Spanish professional footballer who plays as a central midfielder for Club Portugalete.

Club career
Arnedo was born in Logroño, La Rioja, and joined UD Logroñés' youth setup in 2013, from Comillas CF. He made his senior debut with the former's B-team during the 2015–16 season, in the regional leagues.

Arnedo made his first team debut on 3 January 2016, playing the last 11 minutes of a 2–0 Segunda División B away win against CD Lealtad. In July 2016, he joined Tercera División side CD Varea on loan for the season.

Upon returning, Arnedo was assigned to the main squad and became a regular starter under Sergio Rodríguez. On 29 March 2018, he suffered a knee injury during a 0–0 draw at Arenas Club de Getxo, only returning to action in September 2020 after three surgeries.

Arnedo made his professional debut on 29 November 2020, starting in a 0–4 Segunda División away loss against RCD Mallorca. The following 1 February, after just two further matches, he terminated his contract and signed for Club Portugalete in the third division the following day.

References

External links

1996 births
Living people
Sportspeople from Logroño
Spanish footballers
Footballers from La Rioja (Spain)
Association football midfielders
Segunda División players
Segunda División B players
Tercera División players
UD Logroñés B players
UD Logroñés players
Club Portugalete players